Bidokht is a city in Razavi Khorasan Province, Iran.

Bidokht may also refer to:
 Bidokht, Birjand, a village in Birjand County, South Khorasan Province, Iran
 Bidokht, Khusf, a village in Khusf County, South Khorasan Province, Iran
 Bidokht, Zirkuh, a village in Zirkuh County, South Khorasan Province, Iran